Jessica Clark(e) may refer to:

Jessica Clark (actress) (born 1985), British model and actress
Jessica Clarke (footballer), English footballer
Jessica Clarke (model)
Jessica G. L. Clarke, American lawyer